Marco Speranza is an Italian footballer who plays as a left back for Pisa in the Lega Pro Prima Divisione. He is on loan from Milan.

External links

References

Living people
1994 births
Italian footballers
Association football defenders
A.C. Milan players
Pisa S.C. players
Savona F.B.C. players